The Island Fire was a brush fire that broke out in the hills north and west of Avalon, located on Catalina Island, California from May 10 through May 15, 2007. The fire burned  of interior chaparral. The fire loomed large over the town of Avalon, but ultimately only one residence and six commercial structures were destroyed.

The fire
On May 10, 2007, a fire broke out in the hills north and west of Avalon. Avalon City Councilman Scott Nelson said: "We've lost five or six small businesses in Falls Canyon and a construction company building in Birdpark Canyon."

Nelson said about 100 firefighters were battling the blaze and that another 200 new recruits, arriving by hovercraft and Marine helicopters, were bedding down at the airport to work the day shift in the morning. Catalina Express was also running extra boats through the night to take people off the island.  700 evacuees were reportedly at the Cesar E. Chavez center in Long Beach.

The eCatalina.com newsletter reported on June 1, 2007, about the fire, "Fortunately, the fire that captured the attention of the nation did not cause any damage to the charm of the City of Avalon, the community of Two Harbors or the activities, shopping, tours, restaurants and accommodations our visitors enjoy.  of interior chaparral burned sparing most wildlife, including the Catalina Island Fox, bald eagles and bison."

Cause and prosecution
According to Associated Press, the blaze was started by contractors cutting steel wire with a torch. On February 4, 2009, Gary Dennis Hunt, 51, of Indiana pleaded no contest in Long Beach Superior Court to a charge of recklessly starting a brush fire in relation to the wildfire. Hunt agreed to pay at least $5 million in restitution, but the full amount he will pay would be decided at a later hearing. Sentencing was set for May 28, 2009, when he was expected to be sentenced to three years of imprisonment.

References

2007 California wildfires
Wildfires in Los Angeles County, California
Santa Catalina Island (California)
May 2007 events in the United States